Aedia is a genus of noctuid moths erected by Jacob Hübner in 1823. If it is placed in Catocalinae, it is assigned to its own subtribe, Aediina and if placed in Acontiinae, it is assigned to its own tribe Aediini.

Species
 Aedia albomacula (Hulstaert, 1924)
 Aedia arctipennis (Hulstaert, 1924)
 Aedia banian (Viette, 1965)
 Aedia dinawa (Bethune-Baker, 1906)
 Aedia dulcistriga (Walker, 1858)
 Aedia funesta (Esper, 1786)
 Aedia hollina (Dognin 1897)
 Aedia kumamotonis (Matsumura 1926)
 Aedia leucomelas  (Linnaeus, 1758)
 Aedia melas Bethune-Baker, 1906
 Aedia olivescens  (Guenée, 1852)
 Aedia perdicipennis (Moore, 1882)
 Aedia pruna Semper 1900
 Aedia sericea Butler, 1882

References

Erebinae
Noctuoidea genera